The Battle of Lade was fought between the navy of Rhodes and the navy of Macedon. The battle took place in 201 BCE as part of the Cretan War, which lasted from 205 to 200 BCE. The battle was a continuation of hostilities from the Battle of Chios [201 BCE] (Mommsen, Bk III, CH VIII).

The battle was fought off the shore of Asia Minor and the island of Lade, near Miletus. The battle ended in a crushing victory for the Macedonians, nearly ending the war in their favour and resulting in defeat for the Rhodians; however, as a result of the battle, the Roman Republic decided to intervene, and Rhodes was saved from destruction.

Sources

201 BC
Lade (201 BCE)
Lade
Lade
Lade (201 BCE)